is a tokusatsu dark fantasy/historical fiction film directed by Takashige Ichise and distributed by Toho Studios.  It is an adaptation of the eleventh book (Great War in the Capital) of the Teito Monogatari novel by Hiroshi Aramata.  It is the second cinematic adaptation of the Teito Monogatari series and is a sequel to Tokyo: The Last Megalopolis.

Plot
The sequel begins in 1945, during a period extensive of American firebombing over major Japanese cities.  Desperate to end the war quickly, the government concocts a plan to eliminate major key leaders of each country.  With the support of the Japanese government, the Buddhist shaman Kan’nami Kouou (Tetsuro Tamba) plans to curse the leaders of the Allied forces using magic.  Unfortunately, the spirits of those civilians who were horribly killed during the fire bombings culminate together and reincarnate Yasunori Kato (Kyūsaku Shimada), the demonic Onmyoji who was suppressed 20 years ago.  Once again, Kato wants Tokyo to suffer for its crimes and sets off to stop Kouou’s plan from succeeding so that the war will continue and Tokyo will be destroyed.  To challenge Kato, Kouou has hired a young man, Yuko Nakamura (Masaya Kato), who has incredible psychic abilities.  During the course of the story, Nakamura meets and falls in love with Yukiko Tatsumiya (Kaho Minami), who is now working as a nurse in a War Victims Hospital and still suffering from traumatic memories of abuse as a child by Kato.  The young psychic is unable to contend with Kato’s mighty powers and after several battles (the final involving his power being enhanced through artificial means), he is nearly killed.  Despite nearing death, Yukiko’s love gives Nakamura enough strength to perform one last trick which successfully destroys Kato’s physical body.  Meanwhile, Kouou realizes that Japan is doomed to lose the war.  Thus he changes targets, sparing the Allied leaders, and launching a psychic attack against Adolf Hitler which drives Hitler to commit suicide in his bunker.  Yukiko prays to Masakado to seal away Kato’s soul forever.

Production
The box-office success of Teito Monogatari prompted a sequel to immediately be put into production.  The budget was considerably smaller than its predecessor, and the plot adapted only a single book in the series (as opposed to the first film, which had adapted the plot of four books).  The only returning actor from the previous film was Kyūsaku Shimada, reprising his role as the supernatural villain Yasunori Kato.  Screaming Mad George special effects unit was commissioned to do gore effects.  The film also marked the directorial debut of Takashige Ichise, a Japanese film producer best known in the west for financing such J-Horror classics as Ring, Ju-on: The Grudge, and Dark Water as well as their respective Hollywood remakes.

Differences from the novel
The film makes many deviations from the original plot of the novel.  In the original book "Great War in the Capital", the target of the spiritual assassination is not Adolf Hitler, but rather Franklin Roosevelt.  In the book, Kato is not magically "resurrected" as depicted in the film.  Rather he is engaged in fighting off Japanese occupation in China.  When he hears of the project, he returns to Japan to make sure it goes through to completion and systematically kills any political figure that opposes it.  The leader of the protesters is Tomasso, an Italian mystic who controls the Japanese freemasonry lodges.  At the end of the book, Kato kills Tomasso and the project goes to completion.  Roosevelt is cursed, suffers from polio and dies.  This clears the way for Harry Truman to step into office, who authorizes the Hydrogen Bomb to be used against Japan.   Also the mystic hired to curse Roosevelt is Ōtani Kōzui, a famous Buddhist missionary, instead of Kan’nami Kouou (a completely fictional character).

Home video releases
The film and its sequel were both released in Japan on Blu-ray on August 8, 2015 in a Special Edition bundle featuring new cover art by SPFX artist Shinji Higuchi.

References
Notes

Bibliography

External links

Tokyo: The Last War at Toho Kingdom

1989 films
Japanese dark fantasy films
Japanese epic films
Films based on Japanese novels
Adventure horror films
Japanese fantasy adventure films
1980s Japanese-language films
Japanese science fiction horror films
Toho films
Tokusatsu films
1989 fantasy films
1980s Japanese films